The  was an army of the Imperial Japanese Army during the final stages of World War II.

History
As the war situation on the Pacific front grew increasingly desperate for Japan, the Imperial Japanese Army transferred more and more experienced divisions and their equipment out of Manchukuo to other fronts. By early 1945, the vaunted Kwantung Army was largely hollowed out, and indications of a buildup of Soviet Red Army forces on the borders on Mengjiang and Manchukuo were alarming. The Kwantung Defense Army was renamed the Japanese 44th Army on May 30, 1945 and assigned to the Japanese Third Area Army, based in southern Manchukuo. It saw combat against the Soviet Army in Soviet invasion of Manchuria, with combat operations continuing into September, even after the official surrender of Japan. It was officially disbanded at Mukden, with many of its surviving troops becoming Japanese prisoners of war in the Soviet Union.

List of Commanders

Commanding Officer

Chief of Staff

References

Sources

External links

44
Military units and formations established in 1941
Military units and formations disestablished in 1945